Brålanda is a locality situated in Vänersborg Municipality, Västra Götaland County, Sweden with 1,385 inhabitants in 2010.

It is situated 24 km north of the town Vänersborg, by the southern parts of lake Vänern. It is a conjoining town for the rural agricultural lands, and has a large storage silo for crops.

In the town there is one grocery shop, a swimming bath, a campground, and a small library.

References 

Populated places in Västra Götaland County
Populated places in Vänersborg Municipality
Dalsland